The Drums are an American indie pop band from New York City.

Formation
Founding members Jonathan (Jonny) Pierce and Jacob Graham became friends as children, having met at Bible camp at age 11 or 12. Some years later, they formed a short-lived electro-pop group initially named Goat Explosion, eventually renamed Elkland. They released one album, Golden, in 2005 and garnered interest with the single "Apart".

In 2008, Pierce and Graham came up with the concept for The Drums, and Pierce moved to Kissimmee, Florida, where Graham resided at the time, so that they could more readily collaborate. They then moved to Brooklyn, in the spring of 2009, where drummer Connor Hanwick and former Elkland guitarist Adam Kessler joined the band to complete their live sound. The band had their first gig within a week of arriving in Brooklyn at Cake Shop NYC as part of the NYC Pop Fest. In October 2009, the band released their first EP, Summertime!.

Career 
In December 2009 the band was shortlisted as one of the 15 music acts for the BBC Sound of 2010. Subsequently, they placed at No. 5 in this list on 4 January 2010.  In NME's first issue of 2010 they were named number 1 in the magazine's top tips for the year as well as in Clash Magazine'''s Tips for 2010. The Drums were also voted "Best Hope for 2010" in Pitchforks 2009 Readers' Poll. They won the Hall Radar Award for 2010 and were the most Shazamed band of 2009.

In February 2010, the band played venues around the UK on the 2010 NME Awards Tour alongside The Maccabees, Bombay Bicycle Club and The Big Pink, going on to play support band for Florence and the Machine's 2010 Cosmic Love tour. In June 2010 they played as one of the support bands for Kings of Leon in Hyde Park, London.

On May 7, 2010, they appeared on Friday Night with Jonathan Ross, where they performed "Best Friend". Their debut album was officially released on June 7, 2010, on Moshi Moshi and Island Records. The album contained the singles "Let's Go Surfing", "Best Friend," "Me and the Moon" and "Forever and Ever, Amen" as well as "Down By The Water", which had previously been released as part of the band's Summertime! EP. On September 16, 2010, it was announced on the band's Facebook page and website that guitarist Adam Kessler had left the band.

The Drums released the single "The New World" on April 11, 2011, with proceeds going to Japan disaster relief efforts.

For their second LP, the band recorded quickly, again self-producing, often laying down tracks spontaneously in singer Jonny Pierce’s kitchen. They released Portamento on September 5, 2011.  The album title has a deeper meaning for Pierce, as he describes, “Jacob and I meeting as young boys with a shared love for Kraftwerk and Anything Box and Wendy Carlos, and these were all synth pioneers, and a common feature on old analogue systems was ‘Portamento’. The band almost split at the end of June due to stylistic disagreements. Jacob explained, "I think our band is kind of fragile and probably on the verge of breaking up pretty constantly and I say that seriously and jokingly at the same time."

In 2011, Jonny Pierce co-wrote "In The Middle (I Met You There)" with Brooklyn artist Matthew Dear for his EP Headcage. His writing credits also include "You Gave Me Nothing" and "Lose It (In the End)" which are included on Mark Ronson's album Record Collection.

After Portamento's world tour ended in late 2012, founding member Connor Hanwick left the group.

In November 2012, Jonny Pierce announced he would be releasing a solo album in 2013. The Drums continued on with members Jonny Pierce and Jacob Graham.

The Drums made their American television debut on Late Night With Jimmy Fallon on February 15, 2012. MTV gave the band a celebrity chart special on MTV HD channel in May 2012, where Pierce and Graham introduced their favorite videos and bands as well as some of their own videos.

On July 17, 2014, The Drums announced that their third studio album would be called Encyclopedia and would be released September 23, 2014. In an interview with Billboard Magazine, they stated that he and Graham were ready to come back together and give The Drums another try. They holed up in a lakeside cabin in upstate New York and "went crazy", says Graham. "That's when it occurred to me that we can have fun with this and make a record that's interesting and bizarre.' "The resulting cathartic collection of tracks departs from the Drums' signature "tonal palette," as Graham calls it. With taut, spindly guitar lines, liberal sprinklings of tambourine, and uptempo kick drums that belie the brooding, thoughtful content matter of songs like "Best Friend".

On August 20, 2014, they released the single "I Can't Pretend".

On March 1, 2017, they released the debut single, "Blood Under My Belt," from their 2017 album Abysmal Thoughts. It was announced via a Facebook post in which frontman Jonny Pierce took full credit for the writing and producing of the album. Longstanding member Jacob Graham later announced on Instagram that he had left The Drums. In his statement, he said, "It's actually been over a year now since I left the band but it's just now coming to light with today's press. There are no hard feelings whatsoever, I wish Jonny and the band the best of luck. I'd been with the band for almost ten years and I wanted to focus on my puppetry and my work with my new band Sound of Ceres." Their fourth album was released on June 16 on ANTI-.

On April 5, 2019, The Drums released their fifth album, Brutalism.

On December 11, 2020 The Drums released a 3 track titled "Ambulance" 
with Jonny Pierce appearing as a single artist.

Influences
The band cite their major influences as The Wake, The Smiths, Joy Division/New Order, The Tough Alliance, The Legends, The Shangri-las, Starflyer 59, Joy Electric, The Embassy and Orange Juice.
Graham also mentions that reverb in general has played a major role in their sound: "...If reverb didn't exist we wouldn't have bothered trying to start a band."

Solo projects
Both members of The Drums have announced solo records in the works for release in 2013. Jonathan under the name Jonny Pierce, and Jacob as Cascading Slopes. In December, Pierce said in an interview with NME "I wanted to be as self-indulgent as possible with this album. This is pop done the way I think it should be done." The album was never completed however. Instead, Jonny Pierce announced that The Drums had entered the studio and wanted to release a Drums record instead. Cascading Slopes completed the album Towards a Quaker View of Synthesizers in 2013 and it was released in the fall through Plastiq Musiq. Graham described the musical approach on that album, saying "The concept is to write very simple, personal, folk songs but to do it with only old, analog synthesizers".

Band members

Current members
 Jonathan Pierce – lead vocals, keyboards, drum programming, drums, guitar, bass guitar (2008–present)

Current touring members
 Johnny Aries – guitar, bass (2012–present)
 Tom Haslow – guitar, bass (2010, 2014, 2017–present)
 Bryan de Leon – drums (2017–present)
 Drew Auscherman

Former members 
Adam Kessler – guitar, bass (2008–2010)
Connor Hanwick – drums, percussion (2008-2011; touring member: 2011-2012, 2016) 
Jacob Graham – guitar, synthesizer (2008-2016)

Former touring members
 Chris Stein – drums (2011)
 Myles Matheny – bass, guitar, backing vocals (2011–2012)
 Connor Hanwick - guitar (2011-2012, 2016)
 Danny Lee Allen – drums (2011–2017)
 Charles Russell Narwold – guitar, bass (2012–2013)
 Rene Perez – guitar (2014–2016)
 Randy Delgado – Triangle, tambourine(2012–2013)

Timeline

 Discography 
 Studio albums 

 Extended plays 

Singles

Compilations

Guest appearancesNotes'':

Music videos

References

External links
The Drums official Website
Jonny Pierce official website
Cascading Slopes official website

Musical groups established in 2006
Musical groups from Brooklyn
Indie pop groups from New York (state)
NME Awards winners
LGBT-themed musical groups
Frenchkiss Records artists
Moshi Moshi Records artists
Island Records artists
Anti- (record label) artists
2008 establishments in New York City